Blake Gideon (born July 25, 1989) is an American football coach and former player. He is currently Special teams coordinator coach at the University of Texas. As a player, Gideon started all 52 games at safety during his college football career at The University of Texas at Austin, which ranks second in school history. Afterwards, he played professionally for the Arizona Cardinals and the Denver Broncos of the NFL.

High school
Gideon was a two-time all-state selection at Leander High School in football. On the gridiron, Gideon recorded 300 tackles, 10 INTs, six forced fumbles, seven fumble recoveries and 14 TDs in his three years as a starter. He also lettered in baseball and track and field.

College career
Gideon started all 52 games as safety during his college career. His 52 consecutive starts rank second all-time at Texas. He was named to the 2011 Jim Thorpe Award watch list and was a four-time honorable mention All-Big 12 selection. Gideon posted 276 tackles (166 solo), 10 INTs, 20 PBU, two sacks, eight TFL, two forced fumbles, two fumble recoveries and a blocked punt during his college career. He was said to have been a "coach on the field."

Professional career
Gideon went undrafted in the 2012 NFL Draft and was signed as a free agent by the Arizona Cardinals on April 30, 2012. He completed training camp with the Cardinals but was waived on August 21. On October 9 he was signed by the Broncos to their practice squad. He was placed on the reserve/retired list on May 21, 2013, but the Broncos still hold his rights if he desires to return.

Coaching career 
On August 24, 2014, Gideon joined the Florida Gators as a defensive quality control coach. Gideon had played the first three seasons of his college career for the Longhorns under Gators head coach Will Muschamp, who was the defensive coordinator at UT at the time. In 2015, Gideon joined the Auburn Tigers as a graduate assistant. He was given the defensive backs coach duties at Auburn during preparation for the 2015 Birmingham Bowl vs. Memphis after Travaris Robinson joined Muschamp’s staff at South Carolina. Gideon would follow Robinson and Muschamp to South Carolina in January 2016 as a linebackers and special teams graduate assistant coach before accepting a full-time position at Western Carolina, where he was the defensive backs coach for 2 seasons.  In Spring 2018 he joined the Georgia State Staff as Corners Coach. In January 2019, Gideon was hired by newly named head coach Dana Holgorsen to coach safeties and be special teams coordinator at the University of Houston. Gideon was hired by Lane Kiffin to join him at Ole Miss starting with the 2020 season.

After one season in Oxford, Gideon returned to his alma mater to be the safeties coach on Steve Sarkisian’s inaugural Texas Longhorns football staff.

References

http://www.texassports.com/roster.aspx?rp_id=3528

http://www.montgomeryadvertiser.com/story/sports/college/auburnauthority/2016/01/22/auburn-ga-blake-gideon-follows-muschamp-south-carolina/79184112/
https://web.archive.org/web/20160715032120/http://www.catamountsports.com/sports/m-footbl/spec-rel/040816aaa.html

1989 births
Living people
Players of American football from Texas
American football safeties
Texas Longhorns football coaches
Texas Longhorns football players
Arizona Cardinals players
Denver Broncos players
People from De Leon, Texas
Western Carolina Catamounts football coaches
Georgia State Panthers football coaches
Houston Cougars football coaches
Ole Miss Rebels football coaches